Meesaq is an Urdu monthly magazine which is the organ of Tanzeem-e-Islami. The magazine was founded by Maulana Amin Ahsan Islahi. The first issue appeared in June 1959. It is published by Markazi Anjuman Khudam-ul-Quran.

References

1959 establishments in Pakistan
Magazines established in 1959
Monthly magazines published in Pakistan
Magazines published in Pakistan
Religious magazines
Urdu-language magazines